Ujjal Singha is a Sahitya Akademy prize winning poet based in Kolkata. Born in Garshimula village of Jamtara district in Jharkhand, Singha obtained his master's degree in Bengali from University of Calcutta.
He first started off as an official in a nationalised bank in Kolkata and kept on writing poetry and other literary works. He quit job in 2001 to become a full-time poet. He is also an essayist and translator into Bengali from Hindi, English and French.
He received Sahitya Akademi Translation Prize in 2009 for translating Mitro Marjani (a novel of Krishna Sobti) into Bengali from Hindi. He also translated poems of French poet Franck André Jamme (Franck André Jamme).
He has more than 20 books of poems and translations.
He has been editing a poetry magazine Ghorswar for over 25 years. A Senior Research Fellow working on poetry and poetics by Department of Culture, and was awarded the Government of India Prize for a book written on environmental pollution.

Sahitya Akademy Award from former chairman of the akademy, famous poet and writer Sunil Gangopadhyay

References 

1954 births
Poets from Jharkhand
University of Calcutta alumni
People from Jamtara district
Living people
Recipients of the Sahitya Akademi Prize for Translation
Writers from Kolkata